Elaine F. Walker is a psychologist and professor whose research focuses on child and adolescent development, and changes in the brain due to adolescence. Other research interests includes the precursors and neurodevelopment aspects of schizophrenia and other serious mental disorders. She has taken part in writing over 250 articles and six books related to mental health and neuroscience. Walker is the Samuel Candler Dobbs Professor of Psychology and Neuroscience at Emory University.

Biography
Walker received her B.A. in psychology from Washington University in St. Louis in 1974 and was an intern in the Department of Child Psychiatry at Washington University School of Medicine from 1976 to 1977. In 1979, she received her Ph.D. in Clinical Psychology from the University of Missouri and completed a post-doctorate research fellowship at the University of Southern California under the guidance of Dr. Sarnoff Mednick.

Walker began her teaching career as an instructor at California State University in 1978. She then became an associate professor at the Department of Human Development and Family Studies, and Psychology at Cornell University. Since 1986, Walker has taught and conducted research at Emory University. Aside from being a professor of psychology and teaching courses in Abnormal Psychology, and Personality and Psychopathology, she serves as the Director of the Mental Health and Development Research Program at Emory University.

Among the many positions Walker has held, she was the former director of the Graduate Program in Clinical Psychology at Emory University, chair of the Department of Psychology at Emory University, and president of the Society for Research in Psychopathology. Walker also served as the former editor-in-chief of the Association for Psychological Science's Psychological Science in the Public Interest (PSPI) journal.

Awards
Walker is a recipient of many awards including the W. T. Grant Foundation Faculty Scholar Award from 1983 to 1989, American Psychological Foundation's Gralnick Award for Schizophrenia Research in 1995, Society for Research in Psychopathology's Joseph Zubin Life-time Research Award in 2010, and the Association for Psychological Science's James McKeen Cattell Award for Lifetime Achievement in Applied Research in 2013. She recently received the Society for Research in Psychopathology's John Neale Mentorship Award for her dedication towards mentorship in psychopathology.

Research
Walker's Mental Health and Development Research Program at Emory University is funded by the National Institute of Mental Health. Her current projects include a two-year longitudinal study to investigate the biological and psychological risk factors of mental illnesses.

Selected works
Walker, E., Savoie, T. & Davis, D. (1994) Neuromotor precursors of schizophrenia.  Schizophrenia Bulletin, 20, 441–452.
Walker, E. F., & Diforio, D. (1997). Schizophrenia: A neural diathesis-stress model. Psychological Review, 104(4), 667–685.
Walker, E. F., Walder, D. J., & Reynolds, F. (2001). Developmental changes in cortisol secretion in normal and at-risk youth. Development and Psychopathology, 13(3), 721–732.

References

External links 
Emory University: Faculty Profile

Year of birth missing (living people)
Living people
American women psychologists
21st-century American psychologists
Emory University faculty
Cornell University faculty
Washington University in St. Louis alumni
University of Missouri alumni